is a subway station on the Tokyo Metro Chiyoda Line in the Bunkyo-ku, Tokyo, Japan, operated by the Tokyo subway operator Tokyo Metro. It is located near Shinobazu Pond and Ueno Park.

Lines
Yushima Station is served by the Tokyo Metro Chiyoda Line. Through services operate to and from the Odakyu Odawara Line to the south and the JR Joban Line to the north.

Station layout
The station consists of one island platform serving two tracks.

Platforms

History
Yushima Station opened on December 20, 1969.

The station facilities were inherited by Tokyo Metro after the privatization of the Teito Rapid Transit Authority (TRTA) in 2004.

Surrounding area
 Shinobazu Pond and Ueno Park
 Ueno
 Akihabara
 Ueno-hirokoji Station, Suehirochō Station ( Tokyo Metro Ginza Line)
 Ueno-okachimachi Station ( Toei Ōedo Line)
 Yushima Tenmangu Shrine

References 

Railway stations in Japan opened in 1969
Tokyo Metro Chiyoda Line
Railway stations in Tokyo